Too Late... No Friends  is the first full-length studio album by Gob, and was released in 1995 on Mint Records.  It was re-released in 2000 on Nettwerk/Landspeed.  There were 4 singles released of off the album: Soda, Fuck Them, Bad Day and You're Too Cool. Since each single lasted an average of 1:30, there were 4 singles released instead of the usual 2.

Track listing
 "Extra, Extra" - 2:02
 "Lobster Boy" - 1:18
 "You're Too Cool"  - 1:45 
 "Bad Day"  - 1:42
 "Fuck Them"  - 1:28
 "Cleansing"  - 1:16
 "Leave Me Alone"  - 1:41
 "Open Your Eyes"  - 1:57
 "Marlena"  - 2:10
 "I Want You Back Baby" - 1:12
 "Marching Song"  - 1:09
 "Asshole TV"    - 2:17
 "Soda" - 1:35
 "Fido Dildo"  - 1:07
 "Losing Face" - 1:19
 "I Don't Know" - 1:30
 "Centipede" - 1:06
 "Censorshit" - 1:42
 "Custer's Last 1 Nite Stand" - 1:44
 "Hey Stephanie" (The Smugglers cover)

Tracks 1-19 were written by Gob.

The re-release liner notes state that the band photos on the inside booklet of the original pressing were removed due to people complaining of electrostatic shock from the photos.  They replaced said photos with a live band photo of unknown origin with lyrics printed over it.  "Marching Song" is actually a short instrumental track comprised almost solely of kazoo and fart noises.  Early versions of tracks 6, 15, and 19 were released on their 1994 release, Gob.

Personnel
 Tom Thacker - Lead Vocals on tracks 1, 3, 5, 6, 8 (Shared lead with Theo), 12, 13, 15, 17 and Backing Vocals, Lead and Rhythm Guitar
 Theo Goutzinakis - Lead Vocals on tracks 2, 4, 7, 8 (Shared lead with Tom), 9, 10, 14, 16, 18, 19, 20 and Backing Vocals, Lead and Rhythm Guitar
 Patrick "Wolfman Pat" Paszana - Drums, Backing Vocals
 Jamie Fawkes - Bass
 Ian Assbury - Tambourine on "Marlena"
 John Shepp - Engineer
 Blair Calibaba - Mixing
 George Leger - Mastering

References

1995 albums
Gob (band) albums
Mint Records albums
Nettwerk Records albums